House of Councillors elections were held in Japan in 1992. Only half of the seats in the House of Councillors were up for election.

Results

By constituency

References

Japan
1992 elections in Japan
House of Councillors (Japan) elections
July 1992 events in Asia
Election and referendum articles with incomplete results